Tim Gunn's Guide to Style is an American reality television series on Bravo. The series debuted on September 6, 2007 based on the self-help book A Guide to Quality, Taste and Style and is hosted by Project Runway's Tim Gunn, and co-hosted by model Veronica Webb in the first season and Gretta Monahan in the second season. Gunn and his cohost offer to make over guests following their style as long as they adhere to a set of style rules.

Format
The show's format consists of several segments. After meeting the guest and reviewing an interview tape, the show starts with the hosts reviewing and then discarding most of the guest's existing wardrobe. Another segment involves the use of OptiTex fashion design software to illustrate the appearance of different fashions on a computer simulation of the guest, followed by a solo shopping spree for "ten essential items", which the hosts then critique. The guest will also meet with specialty consultants, such as designers, hairdressers or runway coaches, for one-on-one coaching. The show ends with a revealing to the guest's friends and family to show off the changes in their style.

Episodes

Series overview

Season 1 (2007)

Season 2 (2008)

References

External links
 Tim Gunn's Guide to Style official web site
 

Project Runway
Project Runway (American series)
2000s American reality television series
2007 American television series debuts
2007 in fashion
2008 American television series endings
2008 in fashion
American television spin-offs
Bravo (American TV network) original programming
English-language television shows
Fashion design
Fashion-themed reality television series
Makeover reality television series
Reality television spin-offs
Television series by Stone Stanley Entertainment